Every Breath U Take is 2012 Filipino romantic comedy film directed by Mae Cruz-Alviar and starring Piolo Pascual and Angelica Panganiban. It is produced and released by Star Cinema. The film was released domestically on May 16, 2012.

Cast

Main
Piolo Pascual as Leo Dimalanta
Angelica Panganiban as Marjorie "Majoy" Marasigan

Supporting
Wendy Valdez as Queenie/Dianne
Ryan Bang as Ji-Sun
Ryan Eigenmann as Mario
Ketchup Eusebio as Chikoy
Janus Del Prado as Boy
Frenchie Dy as Abby/Abbie
Smokey Manoloto as King
Carlos Agassi as Ace
Joross Gamboa as Jack
Regine Angeles as Leila
Nova Villa as Lola Pilar
Freddie Webb as Lolo Pepe
Lito Legaspi as Leo's dad
Dominic Ochoa as Chief/Leo's Kuya
JM De Guzman as Carwash Boy

Production

Development
The film was announced back in May 2011, that a romantic-comedy film was to be produced and released by Star Cinema that will star Piolo Pascual and supposedly Kim Chiu. But Chiu was replaced by Angelica Panganiban as Piolo's leading lady. The principal photography of the film started in June 2011 with the tentative title of Postcards from Heaven and was later changed its title to Every Breath U Take. The film was intended to release on April 4, 2012, but was moved to May 16, 2012.

Promotion
The cinema trailer was released online via the official YouTube account of Star Cinema on April 4, 2012.

Music
The film's official soundtrack is "Every Breath You Take" originally sung by Sting of The Police and is covered for the film by Piolo Pascual.

Release

Critical response
The film was Graded B by the Cinema Evaluation Board and rated PG-13 by the Movie and Television Review and Classification Board. Critics praised the over-all cast performances, some called the film's story paper-thin.

Box office
The film grossed ₱10 million on its opening day.  As of May 27. 2012 it already earned  ₱42,800,000.00 million pesos.

Trivia
A handsome playboy who doesn't believe in love begins to question his outlook when he meets a young woman who has been praying to find her one true love. reads from ClickTheCity.com.

References

External links
Every Breath U Take on IMDb
Every Breath U Take: Movie Review

2012 films
Philippine romantic comedy films
2010s Tagalog-language films
Star Cinema films
2010s English-language films
Films directed by Mae Cruz-Alviar